Waldmeier is a German surname. Notable people with the surname include:

 Marie-Luce Waldmeier (born 1960), French alpine skier
 Max Waldmeier (1912–2000), Swiss astronomer
 Theophilus Waldmeier (1832–1915), Swiss Quaker missionary

German-language surnames